Spodnje Bitnje is a village south of Kranj in the Upper Carniola region of Slovenia.

Church

The local church is dedicated to Saint Nicholas and belongs to the Parish of Žabnica.

References

External links

Spodnje Bitnje on Geopedia

Populated places in the City Municipality of Kranj